Radu Aldulescu (born 29 June 1954, Bucharest) is a contemporary Romanian novelist.

Notes

1954 births
Living people
Writers from Bucharest
21st-century Romanian novelists
Romanian male novelists
21st-century Romanian male writers